"A Girl Worth Fighting For" is a song written by composer Matthew Wilder and lyricist David Zippel from the 1998 Disney film Mulan. It is performed by Harvey Fierstein, Jerry Tondo, and James Hong, along with Wilder and Lea Salonga, who provide the singing voices of Ling and Mulan, respectively.

Production

Lyricist David Zippel and composer Matthew Wilder were hired by Disney to write songs for Mulan, based on the belief that the pair could "give kind of different sound to each of the songs". Based on its ironic lyrics, the song is described by Wilder as "a comedy song".

"A Girl Worth Fighting For" ends suddenly when the military reinforcements discover an encampment burned to the ground. Zippel described the abrupt end of the song as "a really powerful moment"; Wilder noted that the song's ending "directly inspired and informed the narrative and how the animators would bring that moment to life".

During the recording process, Wilder provided the singing voice for the character Ling, when Gedde Watanabe was not able to provide adequate vocals for the song. Wilder cites his experience being the stand-in vocalist as "just so much fun and so unexpected".

Synopsis

"A Girl Worth Fighting For" begins as the army of men march towards the battle. The song itself acts as a source of comic relief for the audience as the men sing about their dream girls and the roles they'll play in the family to distract for their fatigue and pain. It also builds on Mulan's inability to play the role of a stereotypical male, adding suspense to the later reveal.

Composition 
"A Girl Worth Fighting For" is described as a "delightfully ironic comic number". It starts in the key of E major, and is written in alla breve with the tempo of a "walking march".

Critical reception
Arthur Hu for Asian Focus (Seattle) wrote "A Girl Worth Fighting For" sounds a bit like South Pacifics "There is Nothing Like a Dame" another hit musical comedy about war between Asian powers. Still, the songs stick with stereotypical gender themes, and they still promote the idea that guys have all the fun fighting and killing". Taestful Reviews wrote "A Girl Worth Fighting For" is as funny as Disney songs get, second to only "Gaston." Filmtracks.com wrote "the comical piece performed by Harvey Fierstein ("A Girl Worth Fighting For") proves that people with annoying speaking voices don't sound any better when they sing".

References

Songs from Mulan (franchise)
1998 songs
Disney Renaissance songs
Comedy songs
Songs with lyrics by David Zippel
Songs written by Matthew Wilder